Lindley Murray Moore (May 31, 1788 in Annapolis Valley, Nova Scotia, Canada – August 14, 1871, in Rochester, New York, US) was a Canadian-American abolitionist, and educator.

Early life 
Born into a Quaker family that had been forced to flee their Rahway, New Jersey home during the American Revolution, he was named after the renowned grammarian, Lindley Murray, who "befriended [his father] Samuel Moore in the difficulties growing out of the war."    The family re-visited N.J. in 1810, and Lindley Murray Moore stayed there while his father and siblings continued on to Upper Canada (Ontario). He and his wife, Abigail Lydia Mott, opened a Quaker school in Rahway, N.J. soon after they were married 1813. In 1815, they moved to New York City to take charge of a school under the auspices of the Friends Monthly Meeting. By 1820, they had opened their own boarding school for boys first in Flushing, and then in Westchester Village, NY.  In 1831, Lindley and Abigail bought a farm in what is now Rochester and built a two-story house in the Greek Revival style that is still in use.

Abolitionism 
The minutes of November 1836 Farmington Quarterly Meeting (Orthodox) show that Moore was the clerk for the men's meeting and his wife was the clerk for the women's meeting at the time that the fellowship published a strong abolitionist statement, published as a pamphlet titled: “An Address from Farmington Quarterly Meeting of Friends, to its Members on Slavery.” 

Moore's wife, Abigail Lydia Mott, was sister-in-law to Lucretia Coffin Mott the American Quaker, abolitionist, social reformer, and proponent of women's rights.  Lucretia Coffin Mott was the first president of the American Equal Rights Association.

Rochester was known for its Quaker activists, and in 1838, Moore co-founded and became the first president and recording secretary of the Rochester Anti-Slavery Society. The other co-founder was Asa Anthony, cousin to Susan B. Anthony. Moore was something of an emancipation author, and wrote the essay "Religious, Moral and Political Duties" in the 1853 collection titled Autographs for Freedom.  At the same time he was vice-president of the Rochester Temperance Society. He continued teaching at the high school in Rochester. Moore cooperated with the Rev.Hiram Wilson in providing education to escaped slaves. He "offered to fund any teachers for newly emancipated slaves that Wilson could find"  in Upper Canada.

Around this time, Moore's brothers, Elias, Enoch and John were distinguishing themselves in the Reform politics of Upper Canada.  His brother-in-law, Richard Mott, was elected as an Opposition Party candidate to the Thirty-fourth and reelected as a Republican to the Thirty-fifth Congresses (March 4, 1855 – March 3, 1859).

His wife, Abigail Lydia Mott died of tuberculosis on September 4, 1846, at the age of 51.  At the time, the family was living at 5 Elizabeth Street in Rochester, N.Y.

By 1848, Moore was appointed Principal of Haverford College, a post-secondary Quaker institution.  According to his student, Richard Wood, "He was a portly man of commanding height and mien, of benevolent countenance and expressive features. His students will not soon forget his kindly ways, nor the sonorous tones with which he repeats the verses of Milton and other English poets." He held that post until 1850.

Moore retired to live with his son, Edward Mott Moore, a professor of surgery, and father of the public parks system, in Rochester, N.Y.

References

1788 births
1871 deaths
American Quakers
People from Rahway, New Jersey
American abolitionists
American temperance activists
Presidents of Haverford College
Quaker abolitionists